Lani Belcher (born 10 June 1989) is a British canoeist who previously represented Australia. She competed in the women's K-2 500 metres event at the 2016 Summer Olympics. Belcher won the Gold Medal in the 2017 Canoe Marathon World Championships in South Africa.

Biography
Belcher was born in Cobram, Victoria, Australia in 1989, and lived in Brisbane. Belcher was a triathlete and a track cyclist before she took up kayaking. She began training at the Australian Institute of Sport's facilities in the Gold Coast. In 2007, Belcher moved to England and trained at a canoe club in Elmbridge. At the end of the following year, Belcher was released by the Australian team, allowing her to represent Great Britain.

At the 2016 Summer Olympics in Rio de Janeiro, Belcher finished in fifteenth place in the women's K-2 500 metres event, with her teammate Angela Hannah. Belcher and Hannah were included in the Olympics after teams representing Romania and Belarus were disqualified for doping.

In 2017, at the ICF Canoe Marathon World Championships in Pietermaritzburg, South Africa, Belcher won gold in the Women's K-1 event. It was Britain's first gold medal in the event in more than a decade.

References

External links
 

1989 births
Living people
British female canoeists
Olympic canoeists of Great Britain
Canoeists at the 2016 Summer Olympics
Sportswomen from Victoria (Australia)
ICF Canoe Sprint World Championships medalists in kayak
Canoeists at the 2015 European Games
European Games medalists in canoeing
European Games silver medalists for Great Britain
Australian female canoeists